The Baradla Domica cave system in Hungary is one of the longest researched, visited for centuries for its speleothems. The cave has a natural entrance at Aggtelek, at the foot of a high white cliff that overlooks the edge of the village. The main branch has several short and long connecting side branches. A significant part of the cave has varied colors and shapes providing an unparalleled spectacle of decorative stalactites. Subterranean river waters run through the main branch at times of flood. Natural entrances to the cave have been open from ancient times, and there are traces of Neolithic occupation.

The first written mention of the cave dates from 1549. The first survey was conducted in 1794 by Joseph Sartory. In 1825 it was only known to be  in length. This section was surveyed in 1802 and the first map published. In 1825 the engineer, Imre Vass explored the cave a further  along the main branch, producing an accurate map and a description. His work, published in Hungarian and German was published in 1831.

In order to facilitate cave visits, the first tourist walks were installed in 1806. In 1890 the Red Lake entrances were established and further exploration and extension was conducted between 1927 and 1928.

Baradla, and other caves of the Aggtelek Karst and Slovak Karst was declared as a UNESCO World Heritage Site in 1995. The entire cave system and the catchment areas - with the nearby Domicával wetlands of international importance were subject to protection in 2001. The Aggtelek National Park is an appealing attraction all year round, popular with visitors, who can choose from several hiking trails.

References

Caves of Hungary
Archaeological sites in Hungary
World Heritage Sites in Hungary
Show caves in Hungary
Geography of Borsod-Abaúj-Zemplén County
Tourist attractions in Borsod-Abaúj-Zemplén County
Caves of Aggtelek Karst and Slovak Karst